Lazada Group (t/a Lazada) is an international e-commerce company and one of the largest e-commerce operators in Southeast Asia, with over 10,000 third-party sellers as of November 2014, and 50 million annual active buyers as of September 2019.

Backed by Rocket Internet, Maximilian Bittner founded Lazada in 2012 as a marketplace platform that sells inventory to consumers from its own warehouses. Lazada modified its business model the following year to allow third-party retailers to sell their products on its platform too. The marketplace accounted for 65% of the company's sales in 2014.

Lazada operates in six countries: Singapore, Malaysia, Indonesia, Thailand, Vietnam, and the Philippines. The company raised over $685 million from investors such as Tesco, Temasek, Summit Partners, JPMorgan Chase, and Kinnevik AB, before Alibaba Group acquired a controlling stake in April 2016 to support its international expansion plans.

Often, Lazada is compared to companies in Southeast Asia with a similar e-commerce platform, such as Shopee, Tokopedia, and Bukalapak.

History
In 2012, Maximilian Bittner founded Lazada with the intention of establishing an Amazon-like business model in Southeast Asia, to take advantage of the nascent online consumer market and Amazon's weak presence in the region. Lazada's e-commerce websites soft launched in 2012, before iOS and Android mobile apps for its platform were launched in June the following year.

The company commenced operations in Singapore in May 2014, where it is currently headquartered. In 2014, Lazada recorded $152.5 million in net operating losses, with net revenues of $154.3 million, although the percentage of losses—relative to gross merchandise value—was lower than the previous year due to growth in marketplace sales to $384 million that year, compared to $95 million in 2013.

Lazada faced challenges in 2015, when consumer preference for brick and mortar shopping was high. Less than 1% of people shopped online, compared to the international average of 10% at that time. This meant that Lazada had to tackle issues associated with the lack of credit cards, the concomitant requirement for cash on delivery systems, and the need for reliable delivery—especially in rural regions.

In March 2016, Lazada claimed it had become the largest e-commerce player in Southeast Asia, after recording $1.36 billion in annual gross merchandise value across the six markets it operates in.

In September 2018, the company introduced LazMall on its platform to encourage its users to purchase from authentic brands. New services such as a 15-day return policy and next-day delivery options were also put in place.

In December 2019, Lazada partnered Citibank to launch a new credit card, first in Singapore, and subsequently in other countries.

Financing 
Lazada has raised multiple rounds of funding since its founding in 2012.

In April 2016, Alibaba Group announced its intention to acquire a controlling stake in Lazada by paying $500 million for new shares, and buying $500 million worth of shares from existing investors. Tesco sold its stake in Lazada—totalling 8.6%—to Alibaba for $129 million. Alibaba based its investment on the growth of the middle class in Southeast Asia, having estimated that the regional population with a disposable income of $16 to $100 a day would double to 400 million people by 2020.

In June 2017, Alibaba injected $1 billion in Lazada, raising its stake from 51% to 83%.

Leadership changes

Marketing

Television shows 
 Lazada Garbolnas 12.12 (RCTI, SCTV & Indosiar)
 Lazada Super Party (RCTI, SCTV & Indosiar)
 Lazada 11.11 Super Show (TV3)

Controversies

LazEarth 
Lazada launched its LazEarth campaign in April 2022 to reduce plastic waste in its products and packaging. This coincided with the launch of an Earth Day promotion, when 5,000 products labelled "sustainable" or "planet-friendly" were grouped into a promotional section on Lazada's platform, including polyester shirts, razors, electric toothbrushes, and more. Sustainability experts criticised the promotion as many of the products advertised were plastic disposable products, and offering discounts for such products did little to reduce plastic waste.

Boycott by the Royal Thai Army 
Lazada faced a boycott by the Royal Thai Army in May 2022 due to a controversy arising from a TikTok video promoting a sale by the company. Posted on 5 May, the video included a depiction of a woman using a wheelchair, which was perceived as an attempt to mock the younger sister of King Vajiralongkorn, Princess Chulabhorn. Chulabhorn uses a wheelchair as a result of lupus. 245,000 members of the army were prohibited from patronising Lazada as a result.

See also
Amazon
Bukalapak
Shopee
Tokopedia

References

External links 
  

Alibaba Group acquisitions
Online marketplaces of Singapore
2016 mergers and acquisitions
Singaporean brands